Eugen Kahn (born 20 May 1887 in Stuttgart, Germany – died January 1973 in Houston, Texas) was a German psychiatrist. His "habilitation" supervisors were Emil Kraepelin and Ernst Rüdin.

He argued Willenlos was a misnomer for the Haltlose, as the patients demonstrated plenty of "will" and simply lacked the ability to translate it into action.
He was the first Sterling Professor of Psychiatry and Chairman of the Department of Psychiatry at Yale 1930-1946.

References

1887 births
1973 deaths
German psychiatrists
Physicians from Stuttgart
Yale Sterling Professors
German emigrants to the United States